Benthobatis moresbyi, commonly known as the dark blindray, dark blind ray, or the Indian blind numbfish, is an electric ray species in the family Narcinidae. Moresbyi, was the captan of R.I.M.S. Investigator, the vessel of Indian Navy for surveying deep-water, Therefore, the species recognized with the name Benthobatis moresbyi.

Description 
B. moresbyi is a relatively small electric ray, with males reaching a maximum size of 35.12 centimeters and females a maximum size of 39.24. Its body is entirely dark brown in color. The caudal fin of the species is very long, almost 1/2 the length of its tail. Its dorsal fins have large bases compared to their height, and are located close together.

Habitat and distribution 
B. moresbyi occurs in Yemen, Somalia, and Western India, but likely inhabits other areas as well. It is a bathydemersal species, and lives in depths ranging from 787 - 1071 meters. Little is known about its population or threats, but it may be caught by fisheries as a bycatch. It does not have any conservation actions currently taking place for it, and is listed as Least Concern by IUCN.

References

External links 

 On ITIS

Narcinidae
Fish described in 1898
Fish of the Indian Ocean